Rob Edwards (born January 20, 1997) is an American professional basketball player for the Wisconsin Herd of the NBA G League. He played college basketball for the Cleveland State Vikings and Arizona State Sun Devils before beginning his professional career with the Oklahoma City Blue in 2021. During the 2021–22 season, Edwards was called-up to the Oklahoma City Thunder of the National Basketball Association (NBA).

Early life
Edwards was born and raised in Detroit, Michigan. He attended the University of Detroit Jesuit High School and Academy for the first two years of high school before transferring to Cass Technical High School. He helped Cass Tech to a Class A District title as a junior, scoring 19 points in the district championship game. He earned honorable mention all-state honors as a senior in 2014–15, averaging 16 points, six rebounds, six assists and three steals per game.

College career
Edwards played his first two years of college basketball for the Cleveland State Vikings. He was named to the Horizon League All-Freshman Team in 2016 and second-team All-Horizon League in 2017. Edwards averaged 16.5 points and 4.5 rebounds per game as a sophomore. He transferred to Arizona State following the season and sat out the 2017–18 season due to NCAA transfer regulations. As a redshirt junior, Edwards averaged 11.1 points and 3.3 rebounds per game. He averaged 11.6 points and 3.6 rebounds per game as a senior and scored a season-high 24 points twice.

Professional career

Oklahoma City Thunder / Blue (2021–2022)
Edwards went undrafted in the 2020 NBA draft. In January 2021, he joined the Oklahoma City Blue of the NBA G League after being selected in the G League draft. He played for the Blue in the G League hub season between February and March 2021. In 15 games, he made three starts and averaged 12.5 points, 3.4 rebounds and 1.5 assists in 21.3 minutes per game on 44.0 percent shooting from beyond the arc.

In August 2021, Edwards played for the Oklahoma City Thunder in the NBA Summer League. He signed with the Thunder on September 27, and was then waived on October 11 after appearing in one preseason game. He re-joined the Blue for the 2021–22 NBA G League season. On December 27, 2021, he signed a 10-day contract with the Thunder. He re-joined the Blue on January 6 after appearing in two NBA games.

Wisconsin Herd (2022–present)
On September 2, 2022, Edwards' returning rights were acquired by the Wisconsin Herd in a trade with the Blue. On September 16, he signed with the Milwaukee Bucks, but was waived on the same day. On November 3, 2022, Edwards was named to the opening night roster for the Herd.

Personal life
Edwards has one brother and one sister. His cousin, Kalin Lucas, played basketball at Michigan State and played in the NBA in 2014 and 2019.

Career statistics

NBA

|-
| style="text-align:left;"| 
| style="text-align:left;"| Oklahoma City
| 2 || 0 || 5.5 || .250 || .250 || — || 1.5 || .0 || .0 || .0 || 1.5
|- class="sortbottom"
| style="text-align:center;" colspan="2"| Career
| 2 || 0 || 5.5 || .250 || .250 || — || 1.5 || .0 || .0 || .0 || 1.5

References

External links
NBA G League profile
Cleveland State Vikings bio
Arizona State Sun Devils bio

1997 births
Living people
American men's basketball players
Arizona State Sun Devils men's basketball players
Basketball players from Detroit
Cass Technical High School alumni
Cleveland State Vikings men's basketball players
Oklahoma City Blue players
Oklahoma City Thunder players
Shooting guards
Undrafted National Basketball Association players
University of Detroit Jesuit High School and Academy alumni